Luiz Paulo Fernández Conde (6 August 1934 – 21 July 2015) was a Brazilian architect and politician. He was Mayor of Rio de Janeiro from 1997 to 2001 and Vice Governor from 2003 to 2007.

Biography
Fourth son of Jose Ramon Conde Rivas, Spanish entrepreneur and industrial and Amália Lorenzo Fernández, lyric singer and musician from Spanish ancestry. Conde was also nephew of composer Oscar Lorenzo Fernández. During his childhood, he attended Lafayette and Mello e Souza High Schools. He married in 1959 with his college friend Eliza Rizzo, architect and plastic artist, with whom he had three children: Marcelo, Marcos and Maria Eliza.

Architecture career
Graduated in 1959 at the National Architecture School of the University of Brazil (current Federal University of Rio de Janeiro) and worked in the project development of the Rio Museum of Modern Art (MAM), as collaborator of Affonso Eduardo Reidy.

Conde was a judge, as an invitation of the French government, of the contest for the latest museum of Paris, Musée du quai Branly. He judge works from Christian de Portzamparc, Norman Foster, Peter Eisenman and Jean Nouvel.

His architectural work was described and tributed in the book "Luiz Paulo Conde: Um Arquiteto Carioca", released in 1994 in the Quito Panamerican Biennial.

Political career
Conde assumed offices as Municipal Secretary of Urbanism in the first tenure of Cesar Maia (1993–1997), State Secretary of Government Articulation during the administration of Anthony Garotinho (1999–2002), State Secretary of Environment and Urban Development of Governor Rosinha Garotinho (2003–2007) and State Secretary of Culture of Sérgio Cabral. He was also president of Furnas from August 2007 to September 2008.

Death
Conde was admitted at Samaritano Hospital, in Botafogo, South Side Rio de Janeiro, for almost a year, for the treatment of a prostate cancer. On late night of 21 July 2015, around 3:00 a.m. (BRT), Luiz Paulo Conde was declared dead at the age of 80. His body was buried on São João Batista Cemitery.

References

|-

1934 births
2015 deaths
Vice Governors of Rio de Janeiro (state)
Mayors of Rio de Janeiro (city)
Brazilian architects
Brazilian people of Spanish descent